Robert Wayne Tullis (born 1950/51) is an American politician of the Libertarian Party. He is a former mayor of Mineral Springs, Arkansas, serving from 2015 to 2019, and a former member of the Arkansas House of Representatives, serving from 1979 until 1993.

Biography
Tullis was born to Denzil Tullis and Nina Whitmore Tullis. He served in the House from 1979 until 1993 as a Democrat, representing the 86th district, which comprised parts of Howard and Sevier counties. In 1994, Tullis mounted a campaign for Arkansas State Auditor, losing narrowly in the Democratic primary to Gus Wingfield. In 2010, he was the Green Party nominee for Arkansas State Treasurer, losing to Democratic incumbent Martha Shoffner. The same year, Tullis ran for mayor of Mineral Springs. While he finished in first place with 46% of the vote, since he did not attain a majority a runoff election was necessary, which he lost.

In 2012, Tullis ran for Arkansas's 4th congressional district. After initially exploring a run as a Republican and Libertarian, he later endorsed Republican candidate Beth Anne Rankin. Tullis later decided to run as a Libertarian as Rankin failed to win the Republican nomination. He lost to Republican Tom Cotton.

In 2014, Tullis unsuccessfully sought the Libertarian nomination for Treasurer. That same year, he was elected mayor of Mineral Springs. He chose not to seek re-election in 2018.

Tullis was the only Libertarian holding elected office in Arkansas during his time as mayor of Mineral Springs.

Electoral history

References

1950s births
Arkansas Democrats
Arkansas Greens
Arkansas Libertarians
Candidates in the 1994 United States elections
Candidates in the 2010 United States elections
Candidates in the 2012 United States elections
Libertarian Party (United States) officeholders
Mayors of places in Arkansas
Members of the Arkansas House of Representatives
People from Howard County, Arkansas
Living people